The second USS Conestoga (SP-1128/AT-54) was an ocean-going tug in the United States Navy.  Commissioned in 1917, it disappeared in the Pacific Ocean in 1921.  The fate of the vessel was a mystery until its wreck was positively identified in 2016.

Construction 
The tug was built for the Philadelphia and Reading Railway as the Conestoga in 1904 by Maryland Steel Company, Sparrows Point, Maryland. She was purchased on 14 September 1917 for the World War I duty and designated SP-1128. She was commissioned on 10 November 1917.

Service history

Assigned to the Submarine Force, Conestoga carried out towing duties along the Atlantic coast, transported supplies and guns, escorted convoys to Bermuda and the Azores, and cruised with the American Patrol Detachment in the vicinity of the Azores. At the end of the war she was attached to Naval Base No. 13, Azores, from which she towed disabled ships and escorted convoys until her arrival at New York on 26 September 1919. She was then assigned to harbor tug duty in the 5th Naval District at Norfolk, Virginia.

Conestoga (which had received the hull number AT-54 in July 1920) went to the Pacific in late 1920. She was at San Diego, California and Mare Island, California, during the first three months of 1921. On 25 March of that year the tug steamed out of Mare Island, with a barge of coal sailing via Pearl Harbor to take up an assignment as station ship at Tutuila, American Samoa.

Commanded by Lt. Ernest Larkin Jones, Conestoga was not heard from again. Despite an extensive search, the only trace found of her at the time of her loss was a lifeboat bearing the initial letter of her name found near Manzanillo, Mexico.

Rediscovery

Her wreck was discovered in 2009, as an unidentified shipwreck in the Greater Farallones National Marine Sanctuary, a few miles from Southeast Farallon Island, just off the San Francisco, California coast. In October 2015, a joint NOAA and Navy mission confirmed the wreck was the Conestoga and on 23 March 2016, 95 years after the ship was lost, a formal announcement was made.  The shipwreck was listed on the National Register of Historic Places in 2016.

See also

 USS R-14 (SS-91), a submarine sent to search for the ship.

References

Further reading

External links
USS Conestoga (AT-54) Wreck Site (1921) (Naval History and Heritage Command, December 2, 2020)
history.navy.mil: USS Conestoga Photos

 Roll of Honor

1904 ships
Tugs of the United States Navy
Ships built in Sparrows Point, Maryland
Maritime incidents in 1921
Shipwrecks of the California coast
Ships lost with all hands
History of the San Francisco Bay Area
2016 in California
1921 in California
National Register of Historic Places in San Francisco
Shipwrecks on the National Register of Historic Places in California
Reading Company